Shivarjuna is a 2020 Indian Kannada-language masala film written and directed by Shiva Thejas. The film is being produced by M B Manjula Shivarjun. It features Chiranjeevi Sarja and Amrutha Iyengar along with Akshatha Srinivas in the lead. The supporting cast includes Kishore, Tara, Avinash, Kuri Prathap. The score and soundtrack for the film is by Surag Kokila and the cinematography is by H C Venu.The film is the remake of the 2004 Tamil film Giri starring Arjun Sarja, Divya Spandana and Reema Sen.

Shivarjuna was theatrically released in India on 13 March 2020, receiving mixed reviews; the action sequences were praised while the writing was criticized.

Shivarjuna was re-released after the lockdown on 16 October 2020.

Plot

Shiva, the son of a village chief, participates in an annual competition against their neighbouring village. However, things go haywire and a blood feud begins between the chiefs of the two villages.

Cast 

 Chiranjeevi Sarja as Shiva
 Amrutha Iyengar
 Akshatha Srinivas
 Kishore
 Tara
 Avinash as Rayappa 
 Kuri Prathap
 Dinesh Mangalore
 Sadhu Kokila as Doctor 
 Ravi Kishan as Ramappa
 Tharanga Vishwa
 Shivaraj K R Pete
 Nayana

Box office

The film had a total run of more than 5 weeks.

Music 
The film's background score and the soundtracks are composed and written by Surag Kokila. The music rights were acquired by Aditya Music.

References

External links 

 

2020s Kannada-language films
2020 action films
Indian action films
Films shot in Mysore
Films shot in Bangalore
Kannada remakes of Tamil films